Nyaung U Airport  is an airport located in Nyaung-U (or Nyaung Oo), a town in the Mandalay Region, Myanmar. It is the primary air gateway to the ancient sites of Bagan and surrounding areas. It also known as Nyaung Oo Airport or Bagan Nyaung Oo Airport.

Facilities

Airlines and destinations

References

External links
 

Airports in Myanmar
Mandalay Region
Bagan